Madhya Pradesh State Highway 10 (MP SH 10) is a State Highway running from Guna city in Guna district via Sironj, Berasia and terminates at Bhopal, the capital town of Madhya Pradesh. It is alternatively known as the Hirapur Bypass, the Aron Bypass, and Berasia Road.

It connects the districts of Guna, Vidisha and Bhopal covering a total distance of 193 kilometers.

In the 2009 renumbering, the road from Guna through Sironj and Bersia to Bhopal was defined as State Highway 23. In 2017, SH 10 was defined.

See also
List of state highways in Madhya Pradesh

References

State Highways in Madhya Pradesh